Bacterial circadian rhythms, like other circadian rhythms, are endogenous "biological clocks" that have the following three characteristics: (a) in constant conditions (i.e. constant temperature and either constant light {LL} or constant darkness {DD}) they oscillate with a period that is close to, but not exactly, 24 hours in duration, (b) this "free-running" rhythm is temperature compensated, and (c) the rhythm will entrain to an appropriate environmental cycle.

Until the mid-1980s, it was thought that only eukaryotic cells had circadian rhythms. It is now known that cyanobacteria (a phylum of photosynthetic eubacteria) have well-documented circadian rhythms that meet all the criteria of bona fide circadian rhythms. In these bacteria, three key proteins whose structures have been determined can form a molecular clockwork that orchestrates global gene expression. This system enhances the fitness of cyanobacteria in rhythmic environments.

History: are prokaryotes capable of circadian rhythmicity?
Before the mid-1980s, it was believed that only eukaryotes had circadian systems.

In 1985–6, several research groups discovered that cyanobacteria display daily rhythms of nitrogen fixation in both light/dark (LD) cycles and in constant light. The group of Huang and co-workers was the first to recognize clearly that the cyanobacterium Synechococcus sp. RF-1 was exhibiting circadian rhythms, and in a series of publications beginning in 1986 demonstrated all three of the salient characteristics of circadian rhythms described above in the same organism, the unicellular freshwater Synechococcus sp. RF-1. Another ground-breaking study was that of Sweeney and Borgese.

Inspired by the research of the aforementioned pioneers, the cyanobacterium Synechococcus elongatus was genetically transformed with a luciferase reporter that allowed rhythmic gene expression to be assayed non-invasively as rhythmically "glowing" cells. This system allowed an exquisitely precise circadian rhythm of luminescence to be measured from cell populations and even from single cyanobacterial cells.

Relationship to cell division
Despite predictions that circadian clocks would not be expressed by cells that are doubling faster than once per 24 hours, the cyanobacterial rhythms continue in cultures that are growing with doubling times as rapid as one division every 5–6 hours.

Adaptive significance
Do circadian timekeepers enhance the fitness of organisms growing under natural conditions? Despite the expectation that circadian clocks are usually assumed to enhance the fitness of organisms by improving their ability to adapt to daily cycles in environmental factors, there have been few rigorous tests of that proposition in any organism. Cyanobacteria are one of the few organisms in which such a test has been performed. The adaptive fitness test was done by mixing cyanobacterial strains that express different circadian properties (i.e., rhythmicity vs. arhythmicity, different periods, etc.) and growing them in competition under different environmental conditions. The idea was to determine if having an appropriately functional clock system enhances fitness under competitive conditions. The result was that strains with a functioning biological clock out-compete arhythmic strains in environments that have a rhythmic light/dark cycle (e.g., 12 hours of light alternating with 12 hours of darkness), whereas in "constant" environments (e.g., constant illumination) rhythmic and arhythmic strains grow at comparable rates. Among rhythmic strains with different periods, the strains whose endogenous period most closely matches the period of the environmental cycle is able to out-compete strains whose period does not match that of the environment.

Global regulation of gene expression and chromosomal topology
In eukaryotes, about 10–20% of the genes are rhythmically expressed (as gauged by rhythms of mRNA abundance). However, in cyanobacteria, a much larger percentage of genes are controlled by the circadian clock. For example, one study has shown that the activity of essentially all promoters is rhythmically regulated. The mechanism by which this global gene regulation is mechanistically linked to the circadian clock is not known, but it may be related to rhythmic changes in the topology of the entire cyanobacterial chromosome.

Molecular mechanism of the cyanobacterial clockwork
The S. elongatus luciferase reporter system was used to screen for clock gene mutants, of which many were isolated.

At first, the cyanobacterial clockwork appeared to be a transcription and translation feedback loop in which clock proteins autoregulate the activity of their own promoters by a process that was similar in concept to the circadian clock loops of eukaryotes. Subsequently, however, several lines of evidence indicated that transcription and translation was not necessary for circadian rhythms of Kai proteins, the most spectacular being that the three purified Kai proteins can reconstitute a temperature-compensated circadian oscillation in a test tube.

The output of this oscillator to rhythms of gene expression may be mediated by one or both of the following mechanisms: (1) the Biochemical Cascade Model that implicates the globally acting transcription factors, RpaA and B. RpaA seems to be coupled to the central KaiABC oscillator by histidine kinase SasA through a two-component signaling pathway, and/or the (2) Chromosome/Nucleoid Hypothesis, in which the circadian clock orchestrates dramatic circadian changes in DNA topology, which causes a change in the transcription rates.

Visualizing the clockwork's "gears": structural biology of clock proteins

The cyanobacterial circadian system is so far unique in that it is the only circadian system in which the structures of full-length clock proteins have been solved. In fact, the structures of all three of the Kai proteins have been determined. KaiC forms a hexamer that resembles a double doughnut with a central pore that is partially sealed at one end. There are twelve ATP-binding sites in KaiC and the residues that are phosphorylated during the in vitro phosphorylation rhythm have been identified. KaiA has two major domains and forms dimers in which the N-terminal domains are "swapped" with the C-terminal domains. KaiB has been successfully crystallized from three different species of cyanobacteria and forms dimers or tetramers.

The three-dimensional structures have been helpful in elucidating the cyanobacterial clock mechanism by providing concrete models for the ways in which the three Kai proteins interact and influence each other. The structural approaches have also allowed the KaiA/KaiB/KaiC complexes to be visualized as a function of time, which enabled sophisticated mathematical modeling of the in vitro phosphorylation rhythm. Therefore, the cyanobacterial clock components and their interactions can be visualized in four dimensions (three in space, one in time).The temporal formation patterns of the KaiA/KaiB/KaiC complex have been elucidated, along with an interpretation of the core mechanism based on KaiC phosphorylation patterns and the dynamics of the KaiA/KaiB/KaiC complex. In addition, single-molecule methods (high-speed atomic force microscopy) have been applied to visualize in real time and quantify the dynamic interactions of KaiA with KaiC on sub-second timescales. These interactions regulate the circadian oscillation by modulating the magnesium binding in KaiC.

An alternative view for the core mechanism of this remarkable clock is based on observations of the ATPase activity of KaiC. KaiC hydrolyses ATP at the remarkably slow rate of only 15 ATP molecules per KaiC monomer per 24 hours. The rate of this ATPase activity is temperature compensated, and the activities of wild-type and period-mutant KaiC proteins are directly proportional to their in vivo circadian frequencies, suggesting that the ATPase activity defines the circadian period. Therefore, some authors have proposed that the KaiC ATPase activity constitutes the most fundamental reaction underlying circadian periodicity in cyanobacteria.

Circadian advantage

In the context of bacterial circadian rhythms, specifically in cyanobacteria, circadian advantage refers to the improved competitive advantage of strains of cyanobacteria that "resonate" with the environmental circadian rhythm. For example, consider a strain with a free-running period (FRP) of 24 hours that is co-cultured with a strain that has a free-running period (FRP) of 30 hours in a light-dark cycle of 12 hours light and 12 hours dark (LD 12:12). The strain that has a 24-hour FRP will out-compete the 30-hour strain over time under these LD 12:12 conditions. On the other hand, in a light-dark cycle of 15 hours light and 15 hours darkness, the 30-hour strain will out-compete the 24-hour strain. Moreover, rhythmic strains of cyanobacteria will out-compete arhythmic strains in 24-h light/dark cycles, but in continuous light, arhythmic strains are able to co-exist with wild-type cells in mixed cultures.

Other bacteria
The only prokaryotic group with a well-documented circadian timekeeping mechanism is the cyanobacteria. Recent studies have suggested that there might be 24-hour timekeeping mechanisms among other prokaryotes. The purple non-sulfur bacterium Rhodopseudomonas palustris is one such example, as it harbors homologs of KaiB and KaiC and exhibits adaptive KaiC-dependent growth enhancement in 24-hour cyclic environments. However, R. palustris was reported to show a poor intrinsic free-running rhythm of nitrogen fixation under constant conditions. The lack of rhythm in R. palustris in constant conditions has implications for the adaptive value of intrinsic timekeeping mechanism. Therefore, the R. palustris system was proposed as a “proto” circadian timekeeper that exhibit some parts of circadian systems (kaiB and kaiC homologs), but not all.

There is some evidence of a circadian clock in Bacillus subtilis. Luciferase promoter assays showed gene expression patterns of ytvA, a gene encoding a blue light photoreceptor, that satisfied the criteria of a circadian clock. However, there has yet to be a robust demonstration of a clock in B. subtilis and the potential mechanisms of circadian gene regulation within B. subtilis remain unknown.

Another very interesting example is the case of the microbiome. It is possible that circadian clocks play a role in the gut microbiota behavior. These microorganisms experience daily changes because their hosts eat on a daily routine (consumption in the day for diurnal animals and in the night for nocturnal hosts). The presence of a daily timekeeper might allow gut bacteria to anticipate resources coming from the host temporally, thereby giving those species of bacteria a competitive advantage over other species in the gut. Some bacteria are known to take hints from the host circadian clock in the form of melatonin.

See also
 Circadian rhythm
 Chronobiology
 Cyanobacteria

References

Further reading

 
 

circadian rhythm